A zoetrope is a device used for animation. It makes motion pictures using rotating images viewed through occasional slits to give it a moving feel.

Zoetrope may also refer to:
 Zoetrope: All-Story, a quarterly fiction magazine founded by Francis Ford Coppola
 American Zoetrope, a studio founded by filmmakers Francis Ford Coppola and George Lucas and Coppola's movie-production company
 Zoetrope Interactive, a Turkish video-game developer
 Zoetrope (film), an Irish film
In music:
 Zoetrope (band), an American thrash metal band
 Zoetrope (album), an album by Lustmord; the soundtrack to a short psychological horror movie of the same name
 "Zoetrope", a song by Boards of Canada from In a Beautiful Place Out in the Country

See also
 Zeotrope, a type of liquid mixture